"Follow Me" is the debut single of American musician Uncle Kracker. It was released on November 6, 2000, as the lead single from his debut studio album, Double Wide (2000). It was written by Kracker and Michael Bradford and was produced by Bradford and Kid Rock. According to Kracker, the song has multiple meanings, with people speculating that it could be about drugs or infidelity.

"Follow Me" became a worldwide hit in mid to late 2001. The song reached number one in eight countries: Australia, Austria, Denmark, Germany, Ireland, New Zealand, Scotland, and Sweden. In the United States, it peaked at number five on the Billboard Hot 100 and topped the Adult Top 40 listing. It additionally became a top-10 hit in Norway, Switzerland, and the United Kingdom and peaked within the top 40 in several other European countries.

Meaning
In a 2001 interview with MTV News, Uncle Kracker stated that "Follow Me" was "definitely different" from other songs on Double Wide:

"[W]hen we first started recording that song, with us being from Detroit, that song was supposed to be this doo-wop/Motown song — something different, because every song's got its own little twist. And this song was supposed to have that, but after we recorded it, I was like, 'Man, that could be something for radio,' so we switched it back. [The song] takes on a couple of different meanings. I've heard some people think that I'm talking about drugs, or some people think I'm talking about cheating. I guess it's kinda both. I would never want to say anything that would get myself in trouble, being married with a couple of kids. That song is like a dirty picture painted with a pretty brush."

Chart performance
The song went to number one in Australia, Austria, Denmark, Germany, Ireland, New Zealand, Scotland, and Sweden. In the United States, it peaked at number five on the Billboard Hot 100 chart the week of June 9, 2001, and is Uncle Kracker's highest-charting single release to date. The single also reached number seven on the adult contemporary chart. In the United Kingdom, the song peaked at number three on the UK Singles Chart in September 2001. Following the release of the album Double Wide on iTunes, the song re-entered the UK Singles Chart on August 26, 2012, at number 64 and reached number 44.

Music video
The music video was directed by Nick Egan and premiered the week of November 20, 2000. It featured Mark McGrath, lead singer of Sugar Ray. It is a popular belief that CeeLo Green appears in the video, but it is actually the co-writer and co-producer of this track Michael Bradford, who bears a passing resemblance to Green. Bradford was also a member of Kid Rock's band at the time, where he played bass.

Track listings

US 7-inch single
A. "Follow Me" – 3:34
B. "Yeah, Yeah, Yeah" – 4:57

Australian CD single
 "Follow Me" (radio version) – 3:37
 "Follow Me" (DJ Homicide remix) – 3:28
 "Follow Me" (album version) – 3:35
 "Yeah, Yeah, Yeah" (album version enhanced video) – 3:35

European CD single
 "Follow Me" (radio version) – 3:37
 "Follow Me" (DJ Homicide remix) – 3:28

UK CD single
 "Follow Me" (DJ Homicide remix) – 3:28
 "Follow Me" (album version) – 3:35
 "Follow Me" (radio version) – 3:37
 "Follow Me" (enhanced video)

UK cassette single
 "Follow Me" (DJ Homicide remix) – 3:28
 "Follow Me" (album version) – 3:35
 "Follow Me" (radio version) – 3:37

Charts

Weekly charts

Year-end charts

Decade-end charts

Certifications

Release history

Appearances and covers
This song was featured in the movies Coyote Ugly, 3000 Miles to Graceland, The Animal, The Blind Side and the TV series Roswell High. In 2011, the song was covered by the German rock and roll cover band the Baseballs. The song appeared on their second album, Strings 'N' Stripes. A live version of "Follow Me" can be found on David Allan Coe's 2003 album Live at Billy Bob's Texas.

References

2000 debut singles
2000 songs
Atlantic Records singles
Irish Singles Chart number-one singles
Lava Records singles
Number-one singles in Australia
Number-one singles in Austria
Number-one singles in Denmark
Number-one singles in Germany
Number-one singles in New Zealand
Number-one singles in Scotland
Number-one singles in Sweden
Songs about drugs
Songs about marriage
Songs about infidelity
Songs written by Michael Bradford
Songs written by Uncle Kracker
Uncle Kracker songs